Yari Stevens (born 18 December 2003) is a Belgian professional footballer who plays as a right-back for Belgian National Division 1 side Gent.

Club career
Stevens began his career at the youth academy of Club Brugge. On 22 January 2021, Stevens made his debut for Brugge's reserve side, Club NXT in the Belgian First Division B against Lommel United.

Career statistics

References

External links
Profile at the Club Brugge website

Living people
Belgian footballers
Association football defenders
Club Brugge KV players
Club NXT players
K.A.A. Gent players
Challenger Pro League players
2003 births